Lipowo may refer to the following places:
Lipowo, Gmina Bargłów Kościelny in Podlaskie Voivodeship (north-east Poland)
Lipowo, Gmina Sztabin in Podlaskie Voivodeship (north-east Poland)
Lipowo, Sejny County in Podlaskie Voivodeship (north-east Poland)
Lipowo, Gmina Raczki in Podlaskie Voivodeship (north-east Poland)
Lipowo, Gmina Szypliszki in Podlaskie Voivodeship (north-east Poland)
Lipowo, Masovian Voivodeship (east-central Poland)
Lipowo, Lubusz Voivodeship (west Poland)
Lipowo, Giżycko County in Warmian-Masurian Voivodeship (north Poland)
Lipowo, Kętrzyn County in Warmian-Masurian Voivodeship (north Poland)
Lipowo, Mrągowo County in Warmian-Masurian Voivodeship (north Poland)
Lipowo, Olsztyn County in Warmian-Masurian Voivodeship (north Poland)
Lipowo, Ostróda County in Warmian-Masurian Voivodeship (north Poland)